John Leighton Stuart (June 24, 1876 – September 19, 1962) was a missionary educator, the first President of Yenching University and later United States ambassador to China. He was a towering figure in U.S.-Chinese relations in the first half of the 20th century, a man TIME magazine called "perhaps the most respected American in China." According to one Chinese historian, "there was no other American of his ilk in the 20th century, one who was as deeply involved in Chinese politics, culture, and education and had such an incredible influence in China."

Early life 

John Leighton Stuart was born in Hangzhou, China, on June 24, 1876, of Presbyterian missionary parents from the United States.  His father was a third-generation Presbyterian minister from a distinguished family in Virginia and Kentucky (cousins included J.E.B. Stuart, John Todd Stuart and Mary Todd). They arrived in China in 1868, one of the first three Presbyterian ministers sent to China from the U.S. and the first Christian minister to preach in Hangzhou. Stuart's mother, Mary Horton (known affectionately as "Mother Stuart" in Hangzhou), founded the Hangzhou School for Girls, one of the first institutions of its kind in China. His mother's family had played a leading role in the American revolution in Boston, where her Yankee brand of Calvinism valued and promoted the education of women. Stuart had three younger brothers, David Todd (1878), Warren Horton (1880) and Robert Kirland (1883).

Although an American by nationality who spoke English with a Southern accent, Stuart considered himself more Chinese than American. He spoke the Hangzhou dialect. At age 11, he left China to live for several years with relatives of his mother in Mobile, Alabama. At 16, he was sent to prep school in Virginia, where his outdated clothing and mid-19th century diction handed down from his missionary family in China made him a target for teasing by classmates. He graduated from Hampden-Sydney College and later Union Theological Seminary in Richmond, Virginia, where he aspired to become a missionary educator, inspired by the influence of Robert Elliott Speer.

Missionary and academic 

In 1904, after his marriage, he returned to China with his wife, Aline Rodd, of New Orleans, and became a second-generation missionary in China. There, he helped to establish Hangchow Presbyterian College, which later became Zhejiang University. Together, they had one child, Jack, who would become a Presbyterian minister also.

In 1908, Stuart became a professor of New Testament Literature and Exegesis at the Nanking Theological Seminary. During his tenure, he published 'Essentials of New Testament Greek in Chinese' and 'Greek-Chinese-English Dictionary of the New Testament' (1918). His missionary work in China was sponsored by U.S. President Woodrow Wilson's church in Washington, D.C., where Stuart preached and visited Wilson in the White House on home leave. Stuart's family had close ties with Wilson's family in Staunton, Virginia, where Stuart's father, John Linton, had been named after Wilson's uncle.

In January 1919, Stuart became the first president of Yenching University. Over the next two decades, he built "the Beijing institution into China's greatest university" according to the historian John Pomfret. He established financial, educational and physical foundations of the institution. He quickly made the university among the top universities, and the leading Christian institution, in China. He developed the Yenching campus (now home to Beijing University) in traditional Chinese architectural styles, even though many Chinese faculty preferred a campus more western in design. Stuart's hope was that China would one day absorb the institution as its own, rather than view it as an imposition of cultural imperialism. He also served on the Board of Trustees of Tsinghua University. He forged partnerships between Yenching and Harvard University, and in 1928 helped to create the Harvard–Yenching Institute, an important legacy in cultural exchange. He also formed partnerships with Princeton University, Wellesley College, and the University of Missouri. He cared much about students and teachers and their interactions and is remembered fondly by Yenching alumni for performing their weddings and for hosting an ongoing salon for student intellectuals on campus. Princeton awarded him an honorary doctorate of humane letters in 1933. In 1936, Yenching threw him a 60th birthday banquet, where kitchen and cleaning workers presented him with a plaque to hang above his door that read, "His kindness knows no class boundaries."

After the establishment of the People's Republic of China in 1949, Yenching University ceased to exist. In 1952, Peking University relocated to the Yenching campus and absorbed most of its academic departments while Tsinghua University absorbed other departments. The official Beijing University history museum makes no mention of Stuart or the institution's western ties, yet the campus stands as his memorial.

Political Activities 
"Stuart was the consummate friend of China," wrote historian John Pomfret. "In the 1910s, he had argued that Americans should educate the Chinese more and proselytize them less. Stuart had been an early advocate of tearing up the unequal treaties with China, calling on the United States in 1925 to take the lead with 'an act of aggressive goodwill." He supported Chinese nationalism.  He was sympathetic to students and faculty at Yenching who  participated in May Fourth Movement (1919–1921) and May Thirtieth Movement (1925). He favored the Northern Expedition (1926-1927) against the warlord factions in Beijing. He led a protest with Yenching students against the Japanese invasion of Manchuria (1937). When the invaders overran Beijing in 1937, the Japanese ordered Stuart to fly the puppet regime flag at the Yenching University campus and offer his personal "thanks" to the Japanese military for the institution's "liberation." Stuart, well known among Chinese as a man with a strong moral conscience, declined promptly, sending a terse note to the Japanese commander: "We are refusing to comply with these orders." He resisted Japanese aggression in China in his sermons and speeches on campus and in travels throughout the country. After Japan's attack on Pearl Harbor, the Japanese incarcerated Stuart in Beijing for three years and eight months until the war ended.

His deep involvement with China's politics, education and culture won him respect among Chinese intellectuals and students during the 1930s and 1940s. Wen Yiduo, a scholar whom Mao Zedong and the Chinese communists often praised, expressed his respect and admiration for John Leighton Stuart in his famous last speech. Yet, when Wen Yiduo's last speech was included in Chinese textbooks in Mainland China, the paragraph praising John Leighton Stuart was deleted.

U.S. Ambassador to China 

On July 4, 1946, Stuart was appointed the U.S. Ambassador to China and, in this position, worked in concert with George C. Marshall to mediate between Nationalists and Communists. He forged ties with the leaders in the Nationalist Party, particularly Chiang Kai-shek, and with Communist leader Zhou Enlai, both of whom who spoke the same Zhejiang dialect as Stuart. He had taught and protected underground Communist Party members at Yenching University for years, some of whom had become party leaders. The efforts of Marshall and Stuart to mediate between the Kuomintang and the Chinese Communist Party are commemorated in the Zhou Enlai/Deng Yingchao Memorial Hall in Nanjing.
 
After Marshall's departure from China in January 1947, Stuart led the mediation efforts that changed from all-out support of the Nationalist government to mediating the coalition government, to negotiating an understanding with the Communist party. When the Nationalist government fled Nanjing, and Communist forces entered the city in April 1949, Stuart maintained the U.S. Embassy in Nanjing. He sought accommodation with the Communist Party in an effort to maintain U.S. presence and influence in China, making contact through a graduate of Yenching University, Huang Hua, who became a member of the Nanjing Military Council.

In recommending constructive engagement as an alternative to the official U.S. policy toward China, "Stuart came to advocate the kind of asymmetrical Cold War response to communism that George F. Kennan envisioned and that Professor John Gaddis described in his 1980 Bernath Prize Lecture to the Society for Historians of American Foreign Relations." At the time, however, Washington was unwilling to open a dialogue with Communist China.

In reaction to the State Department White Paper on China, Mao Zedong published a sarcastic essay Farewell, Leighton Stuart!, which is still taught in Chinese schools as one of the founding documents of the revolution. Mao wrote:

John Leighton Stuart, who was born in China in 1876, was always a loyal agent of U.S. cultural aggression in China. He started missionary work in China in 1905 and in 1919 president of Yenching University, which was established by the United States in Peking. He has fairly wide social connections and spent many years running missionary schools in China, he once sat in a Japanese gaol during the War of Resistance. On July 11, 1946, he was appointed U.S. ambassador to China. On August 2, 1949, because all the efforts of U.S. imperialism to obstruct the victory of the Chinese people's revolution had completely failed, Leighton Stuart had to leave China quietly.

Stuart was recalled to the U.S. on August 2, 1949, and formally resigned as Ambassador on November 28, 1952.  He was the last person to hold that position before resumption of diplomatic relations between the two countries three decades later. After suffering a stroke that incapacitated him for the remainder of his life, Stuart died in Washington, D.C. in 1962. His obituary in The New York Times reported, "During his years as a missionary and educator, Dr. Stuart -- gentle mannered and humane -- was one of the most respected Americans in China."

Stuart's memoirs, "Fifty Years in China," were only half completed when he was incapacitated by a stroke. The book was finished and published by officials of the U.S. State Department to advance a hard line, anti-Communist political agenda, and the angry, pugnacious tone of the book's latter chapters betray Stuart's self-effacing modesty and patrician voice evident in the first six chapters.

Final Wish and Official Recognition
Stuart specified in his will that he be buried in China, in Beijing, at the Yenching University campus, where his wife was buried following her death in 1926.  In November 2008, his ashes were finally taken to China from Washington and buried where his father and mother and a brother were interred, at his birthplace, Hangzhou.

On September 4, 2016, Chinese President Xi Jinping recognized Stuart during a banquet held to welcome the heads of foreign delegations attending the G20 Summit in Hangzhou, noting to the assembled crowd of diplomats, "A hundred and forty years ago, in June 1876, John Leighton Stuart, the former US ambassador to China, was born here in Hangzhou. He went on to live in China for over 50 years and was buried in Hangzhou." Chinese historians said it was the first time since Mao Zedong's famous essay that a top Chinese official had recognized Stuart in public, a signal of the rehabilitation of Stuart's official reputation in modern China.

Fifty years after Stuart left China, Hangzhou officials restored the Stuart house in Hangzhou as a memorial to the family's contributions to China. The design of the house, a New Orleans style double gallery with garconniere in the rear, was inspired by Aline Rodd Stuart's childhood home on Chestnut Street in the Garden District of New Orleans.
Moreover, this new point of view on  John Leighton Stuart's personality was vividly pictured in the new Chinese drama "Diplomatic Situation" where John Leighton Stuart is the one of the main positive characters. <https://www.youtube.com/watch?v=AJItDmX1J6o&list=PLSIJismKOisEABMYuMij_3zJdCKg8BfoG&index=1>

Works 
 The Essentials of New Testament Greek in Chinese. Based on Huddilston's the Essentials of New Testament Greek (1917)
 The Jerusalem Meeting of the International Missionary Council: March 24 - April 8, 1928. The christian life and message in relation to non-christian systems. Christianity and Confucianism, Volume 1 (1928)
 Fifty Years In China The Memoirs Of John Leighton Stuart Missionary And Ambassador (1946)
 The Challenge of Asia to Christianity
 My Fifty Years in China: The Memoirs of John Leighton Stuart, Missionary and Ambassador

Notes

References and further reading

Yu-ming Shaw, An American Missionary in China: John Leighton Stuart and Chinese-American Relations (Cambridge: Council on East Asian Studies Harvard University: Distributed by Harvard University Press, 1992).
Philip West, Yenching University and Sino-Western Relations, 1916-1952 (Cambridge: Harvard University Press, 1976).
 Charles W. Hayford, "The Ashes of the American Raj in China; John Leighton Stuart, Edgar Snow, and Pearl S. Buck," The Asia-Pacific Journal Vol 50-5-08, December 9, 2008 .
Kenneth W Rea, John C Brewer, ed., John Leighton Stuart: The Forgotten Ambassador: The Reports of John Leighton Stuart, 1946-1949 (Westview Press 1981), .
John Leighton Stuart: Fifty years in China, The memoirs of John Leighton Stuart, missionary and ambassador. (New York: Random House, 1954).
John Leighton Stuart, Greek-Chinese-English dictionary of the New Testament (Presbyterian Mission Press 1918).
Mao Tse-tung, "Farewell, Leighton Stuart!," In: Selected Works of Mao Tse-tung (Beijing, Foreign Languages Press 1969), vol. IV, p. 433-440.

External links
Remembering John Leighton Stuart, New York Times,November 21, 2008. Accessed October 19, 2011.
The father of Yenching University, CCTV,July 12, 2011,Accessed October 19, 2011.
John Leighton Stuart, China Expert, Is Buried Hangzhou at Last
Mao Zedong: Farewell, Leighton Stuart!

1876 births
1962 deaths
Presbyterian missionaries in China
Academic staff of Yenching University
Hampden–Sydney College alumni
American prisoners of war in World War II
American expatriate academics
American expatriates in China
Educators from Hangzhou
Ambassadors of the United States to China
Children of American missionaries in China
American Presbyterian missionaries
Presidents of Yenching University